Victor Merey is an Arab-Israeli footballer, who plays for F.C. Tzeirei Tayibe.

References

External links
Hapoel Tel Aviv official website

1989 births
Living people
Israeli footballers
Beitar Nes Tubruk F.C. players
Hapoel Tel Aviv F.C. players
Maccabi Petah Tikva F.C. players
Ironi Tiberias F.C. players
Hakoah Maccabi Amidar Ramat Gan F.C. players
Hapoel Bnei Lod F.C. players
Maccabi Bnei Reineh F.C. players
F.C. Holon Yermiyahu players
Israeli Premier League players
Liga Leumit players
Footballers from Ar'ara
Association football forwards
Arab citizens of Israel
Arab-Israeli footballers